Hon-Life: Satisfaction Project is a South Korean show distributed by JTBC airs on Saturday at 6:10 KST.

Format 
It is showcase the lifestyles of celebrities who enjoy being alone, such as eating and traveling alone.

Cast 

 Main Host
 Jun Hyun-moo
 Cast
 Min Kyung-hoon
 Kang Han-na
 JeA
 Kim Hee-chul
 Angelina Danilova
 Ji Sang

List of episodes and ratings 
In the tables below, the  represent the lowest ratings and the  represent the highest ratings.

References

2019 South Korean television series debuts
Korean-language television shows
2019 South Korean television series endings